Bassam Shakir (born 17 May 2000) is an Iraqi footballer who plays as a winger for Al-Shorta in the Iraqi Premier League.

International career
On 24 May 2021, Bassam Shakir made his first international cap with Iraq against Tajikistan in a friendly.

Honours

Club
Al-Shorta
Iraqi Premier League: 2021–22
 Iraqi Super Cup: 2022

References

External links 
 

2000 births
Living people
Iraqi footballers
Al-Naft SC players
Al-Shorta SC players
Iraq international footballers
Association football wingers